= Wendy Demark-Wahnefried =

Wendy Demark-Wahnefried is currently employed as a professor, the chair of nutritional sciences, and the associate director for cancer prevention at the University of Alabama at Birmingham. In the past she was employed in the Medical Center at Duke University. Demark-Wahnefried’s training is rooted mostly in biochemistry, behavioral science, and genetics. She graduated from the University of Michigan in 1978 where she earned her bachelor's degree in Nutritional science and Biochemistry. She currently serves as a member of different panels that are very prominent in the field of cancer research. Demark-Wahnefried is on the panel for the American Cancer Society and the Institute of Medicine and Cancer Research. One of her main research interests deals with how diet and genetic interactions affect breast and prostate cancer.

Over the years, her research has dealt with topics in basic nutritional science, but has also done clinical research that looks at how nutrition in cancer patients. Through this focus of her research, her lab has done some of the largest research looking at how the metabolism changes in response to different cancer treatments. One of her largest research findings deals with providing gardens to better the dietary habits of cancer survivors. Demark-Wahnefried has received a grant and has expanded the Harvest for Health study which is the study that looks at how changes in dietary habits can affect the lives of cancer survivors. She will be looking at 426 different cancer survivors to collect data for her research.
